Cass is the surname of:

 Annie Cass, later Annie Pearson, Viscountess Cowdray (1860–1932), British philanthropist and suffragist
Barbara Cass-Beggs (1904–1990), Canadian folk song collector, singer and teacher
Bettina Cass, Australian sociologist and social policy adviser
 Brian Cass (born 1947), British business executive
 David Cass (1937–2008), American economist
 Dick Cass (born 1946), President of the National Football League's Baltimore Ravens
 Frank Cass (1930–2007), British publisher of books and academic journals
 Frederick Cass (1913–2000), Canadian politician
 George Washington Cass (1810–1888), American industrialist and president of the Northern Pacific Railway
 Godfrey Cass (1867–1951), Australian actor
 Harriet Cass (born 1952), British radio broadcaster
 Henry Cass (1902–1989), English film director
 John Cass (1661–1718), English politician and philanthropist
 Lewis Cass (1782–1866), American Democratic presidential nominee in 1848, Secretary of State, Secretary of War, Michigan Governor
Lewis Cass Jr. (1814–1878), American diplomat
 Maurice Cass (1884–1954), character actor
 Melnea Cass (1896–1978), American community and civil rights activist
 Moss Cass (1927–2022), Australian former politician
 Peggy Cass (1924–1999), American actress, comedian and game show panelist
 Robin Cass Canadian film and television producer
 Rodney Cass (1940–2018), English cricketer
 Ronald Cass (1923–2004), screenwriter and composer
 Thomas Cass (colonel) (1821–1862), Union colonel in the American Civil War
 Thomas Cass (surveyor) (1817–1895), pioneer surveyor in New Zealand
 Wilfred Cass (born 1924), businessman and co-founder of the Cass Sculpture Foundation